Direct Introduction is one of the Seventeen tantras of Dzogchen Upadesha.

Primary resources
ngo sprod rin po che spras pa'i zhing khams bstan pa'i rgyud @ Wikisource in Wylie
ངོ་སྤྲོད་རིན་པོ་ཆེ་སྤྲས་པའི་ཞིང་ཁམས་བསྟན་པའི་རྒྱུད @ Wikisource in Uchen (Tibetan Script), Unicode

Notes

Dzogchen texts
Nyingma tantras